Kadri Veseli (born 31 May 1967) is a Kosovar politician, former Chairman of the Assembly of Kosovo and the Kosovo Intelligence Service. He is the leader of the Democratic Party of Kosovo. Veseli was one of the founders and leaders of the Kosovo Liberation Army. He also was the chief of the Kosovo Intelligence Service, a post-war state intelligence organisation.

In 2020, he was indicted for war crimes and crimes against humanity during the Kosovo War.

Education and personal life 
Veseli began his higher education studies in 1990 at the University of Pristina, in the faculty of Agriculture, and at the Higher Pedagogical School in the Albanian Language and Literature Department. Due to political circumstances, he was forced to complete the remainder of his studies in Albania. He has a bachelor's degree from the Agricultural University of Tirana, Albania, and an MBA in General Management from Sheffield University's international faculty in Thessaloniki, Greece. Veseli is currently preparing his PhD thesis in the University of Ljubljana in Slovenia.

Veseli speaks English, German and Albanian. He has four children with his wife, Violeta.

Career
Veseli was one of the leaders of the Kosovar student movement during 1988–1990, which fought for humanitarian and political rights for Kosovan Albanians, including the right for independence.

During the Kosovo War, he was appointed commander of the Counter Intelligence Service (G-2) of the KLA. He remained the leader of the organisation as it transformed into Kosovo Intelligence Service (SHIK), a post-war intelligence organisation, until its disbandment in 2008.

At the end of 2012, Veseli formally joined the Democratic Party of Kosovo (PDK), and on January 27, 2013 he became the deputy head of the party. Veseli was voted Chairman of the Assembly of the Republic of Kosovo on 8 December 2014.

In May 2016, following the resignation of Hashim Thaçi to become President of the Republic, Veseli became President of the PDK by popular vote. He was elected with no votes against and no abstentions.

Following the 2017 Kosovan parliamentary election, PDK joined the PANA coalition that won a majority of parliamentary seats with 245,627 votes (33.74%). Veseli won the most votes of any coalition candidate, with 129,947 votes. Following those results, Veseli was re-elected as Chairman of the Assembly on 7 September 2017.

In the October 6th 2019 election, Veseli was the PDK's nominee for the prime ministership of Kosovo. His party took the third place with 178,637 votes (21.23%), with Veseli winning 145,881 votes.

In 2020, the Kosovo Specialist Chambers and Specialist Prosecutor's Office filed a ten-count Indictment, charging Veseli and others for crimes against humanity and war crimes.

War crime accusations
On 24 June 2020, the Kosovo Specialist Chambers and Specialist Prosecutor's Office located in The Hague filed a ten-count indictment for the court's consideration. The indictment charged Veseli, Hashim Thaçi, and others for crimes against humanity and war crimes, including murder, enforced disappearance of persons, persecution, and torture, allegedly occurring during the 1998-99 independence war with Serbia. The indictment charges the suspects with approximately 100 murders of Kosovo Albanians, Serbs, Roma, and political opponents. According to the press release, the Specialist Prosecutor stated that it was necessary to make the issue public due to repeated efforts by Thaçi and Veseli to obstruct and undermine the work of the Kosovo Specialist Chambers.

References

1966 births
Living people
Politicians from Mitrovica, Kosovo
Kosovo Liberation Army soldiers
Chairmen of the Assembly of the Republic of Kosovo
People indicted for war crimes
Military personnel from Mitrovica, Kosovo
People indicted by the Kosovo Specialist Chambers